Spanska Siw is a 1970 Siw Malmkvist studio album.

Track listing

Side A
Spanska Siw (Spanish Rose)
Livet är fullt av svindlande höjder (The Peaceful Heart)
Vackraste paret i världen (La Coppia Piu' Bella Del Mondo), with Svante Thuresson
Ingenting går upp mot gamla Skåne (Wärst du doch in Düsseldorf geblieben)
Primaballerina

Side B
Köp en tulpan (annars får du en snyting)
Ljuva barndomstid (Sweet Blidness)
Jag är kvinna, du är man (You're a Woman, I'm a Man), with Svante Thuresson
Leonard, Lisa och Leif (Love Was so Easy to Give)
Riddar Blåskägg (Take a Bow Rufus Humfry)

References 

1970 albums
Siw Malmkvist albums